USS Langley (CV-1/AV-3) was the United States Navy's first aircraft carrier, converted in 1920 from the collier USS Jupiter (Navy Fleet Collier No. 3), and also the US Navy's first turbo-electric-powered ship. Langley was named after Samuel Langley, an American aviation pioneer. Following another conversion to a seaplane tender, Langley fought in World War II. On 27 February 1942, while ferrying a cargo of USAAF P-40s to Java, she was attacked by nine twin-engine Japanese bombers of the Japanese 21st and 23rd naval air flotillas and so badly damaged that she had to be scuttled by her escorts. She was also the only carrier of her class.

Construction
President William H. Taft attended the ceremony when Jupiters keel was laid down on 18 October 1911, at the Mare Island Naval Shipyard in Vallejo, California. She was launched on 24 August 1912, sponsored by Mrs. Thomas F. Ruhm; and commissioned on 7 April 1913, under Commander Joseph M. Reeves.

Jupiter was the first turbo-electric-powered ship of the US Navy.  had been built with a steam turbine and geared drive but performance was inferior to the earlier Cyclops with its two triple expansion steam engines. Jupiters electric drive, designed by William Le Roy Emmet and built by the General Electric Company, consisted of two electric motors, each directly connected to a propeller shaft, powered by a single Curtis turbine and alternator set. There was also a weight saving with the turbo-electric drive being 156 tons versus the 280 tons of equivalent machinery for Cyclops.

Service history

Collier

After successfully passing her sea trial Jupiter embarked a United States Marine Corps detachment at San Francisco, California, and reported to the Pacific Fleet at Mazatlán, Mexico, on 27 April 1914, bolstering US naval strength on the Mexican Pacific coast in the tense days of the Veracruz crisis. She remained on the Pacific coast until she departed for Philadelphia, on 10 October. En route, the collier steamed through the Panama Canal on Columbus Day, the first vessel to transit it from the Pacific to the Atlantic.

Prior to America's entry into World War I, she cruised the Atlantic and Gulf of Mexico, attached to the Atlantic Fleet Auxiliary Division. The ship arrived at Norfolk, Virginia, on 6 April 1917, and was assigned to the Naval Overseas Transport Service, interrupted her coaling operations by two cargo voyages to France, in June 1917 and November 1918. The first voyage transported a naval aviation detachment of 7 officers and 122 men to England. It was the first US aviation detachment to arrive in Europe and was commanded by Lieutenant Kenneth Whiting, who became Langley first executive officer five years later. Jupiter was back in Norfolk, on 23 January 1919, whence she sailed for Brest, France, on 8 March, for coaling duty in European waters to expedite the return of victorious veterans to the United States. Upon reaching Norfolk, on 17 August, the ship was transferred to the West Coast. Her conversion to an aircraft carrier was authorized on 11 July 1919, and she sailed to Hampton Roads, Virginia, on 12 December, where she was decommissioned on 24 March 1920.

Aircraft carrier

Jupiter was converted into the first US aircraft carrier at the Norfolk Naval Shipyard, Portsmouth, Virginia. On 11 April 1920, she was renamed Langley in honor of Samuel Pierpont Langley, an American astronomer, physicist, aeronautics pioneer and aircraft engineer, and she was given the hull number CV-1. By early 1921, memories of World War I were swaying public opinion away from warship construction toward disarmament. Article VIII of the Washington Naval Treaty provided an exemption for experimental aircraft carriers in existence or building on 12 November 1921. The Washington Naval Treaty was signed on 6 February 1922; and Langley was recommissioned on 20 March 1922 for the purpose of conducting experiments in seaborne aviation. The commanding officer was Commander Kenneth Whiting, who had first proposed conversion of a collier to the General Board of the United States Navy three years and twelve days earlier.

As the first American aircraft carrier, Langley was the scene of several seminal events in US naval aviation. On 17 October 1922, Lt. Virgil C. Griffin piloted the first plane—a Vought VE-7—launched from her full-length wooden deck. Though this was not the first time an airplane had taken off from a ship, and though Langley was not the first ship with an installed flight deck, this one launching was of monumental importance to the modern US Navy. The era of the aircraft carrier was born, introducing into the navy what was to become the vanguard of its forces in the future. With Langley underway nine days later, Lieutenant Commander Godfrey de Courcelles Chevalier made the first landing, in an Aeromarine 39B. On 18 November, Commander Whiting was the first aviator to be catapulted from a carrier's deck.<ref>Though catapults had already been used for launching aircraft from ships – e.g. Henry C. Mustin in 1915 from the cruiser </ref>

An unusual feature of Langley was provision for a carrier pigeon house on the stern between the 5-inch guns. Pigeons had been carried aboard seaplanes for message transport since World War I, and were to be carried on aircraft operated from Langley. The pigeons were trained at the Norfolk Naval Shipyard while Langley was undergoing conversion. As long as the pigeons were released a few at a time for exercise, they returned to the ship; but when the whole flock was released while Langley was anchored off Tangier Island, the pigeons flew south and roosted in the cranes of the Norfolk shipyard. The pigeons never went to sea again and the former pigeon house became the executive officer's quarters; but the early plans for conversion of Lexington and Saratoga included compartments for pigeons.

By 15 January 1923, Langley had begun flight operations and tests in the Caribbean Sea for carrier landings. In June, she steamed to Washington, D.C., to give a demonstration at a flying exhibition before civil and military dignitaries. She arrived at Norfolk on 13 June, and commenced training along the Atlantic coast and Caribbean which carried her through the end of the year. This publicity cruise stopped at Bar Harbor, Maine, Portland, Maine, Portsmouth, New Hampshire, Gloucester, Massachusetts, Boston and New York City. After entering port and anchoring, Langley published a takeoff and landing schedule so interested civilians might watch. Although the aviators did some formation flying over the cities, people were more interested in watching the shipboard takeoffs and landings. The planes seldom attained flying speed on deck when taking off while the ship was at anchor with little or no wind, but the pilots were confident their Vought VE-7s could reach flying speed during the  drop from the flight deck before reaching the water. In 1924, Langley participated in more maneuvers and exhibitions, and spent the summer at Norfolk for repairs and alterations, she departed for the West Coast late in the year and arrived in San Diego, California, on 29 November to join the Pacific Battle Fleet.

In 1927, Langley was at the Guantanamo Bay Naval Base. For the next 12 years, she operated off the California coast and Hawaii, engaged in training fleet units, experimentation, pilot training, and tactical-fleet problems. Langley was featured in the 1929 silent film about naval aviation The Flying Fleet.Seaplane tender

On 25 October 1936, she put into Mare Island Navy Yard, California for overhaul and conversion to a seaplane tender. Though her career as a carrier had ended, her well-trained pilots had proved invaluable to the next two carriers, Lexington and Saratoga (commissioned on 14 December and 16 November 1927, respectively).Langley completed conversion on 26 February 1937 and was assigned hull number AV-3 on 11 April. She was assigned to the Aircraft Scouting Force and commenced her tending operations out of Seattle, Washington, Sitka, Alaska, Pearl Harbor, and San Diego, California. She departed for a brief deployment with the Atlantic Fleet from 1 February-10 July 1939, and then steamed to assume duties with the Asiatic Fleet at Manila arriving on 24 September.

World War II
On the entry of the US into World War II, Langley was anchored off Cavite, Philippines. On 8 December, following the invasion of the Philippines by Japan, she departed Cavite for Balikpapan in the Dutch East Indies. In the natural state of alarm (the Attack on Pearl Harbor had happened the day before) 300 rounds were shot to an object in the sky before it was realized that it was the planet Venus. As the Japanese advance continued, Langley proceeded to Australia, arriving in Darwin on 1 January 1942. She then became part of the American-British-Dutch-Australian Command (ABDACOM) naval forces. Until 11 January, Langley assisted the Royal Australian Air Force in running anti-submarine patrols out of Darwin.Langley went to Fremantle to pick up a cargo of 32 P-40 fighters of the Far East Air Force's 13th Pursuit Squadron (Provisional), along with U.S. Army Air Force (USAAF) pilots and ground crews. At Fremantle, Langley and the cargo ship  (loaded with an additional 27 unassembled and crated P-40s), joined Convoy MS.5 which had just arrived from Melbourne bound for Colombo, Ceylon with troops and supplies eventually destined for India and Burma. MS.5 departed Fremantle on 22 February. En route to Colombo, Langley and Sea Witch were directed by ABDACOM to leave the convoy and instead proceed individually to deliver the planes to Tjilatjap, Java.

Later that morning, a Japanese reconnaissance aircraft located the formation. Rather than dropping all their bombs at once, the Japanese bombers attacked releasing partial salvos. Since they were level bombing from medium altitude, Langley was able to alter helm when the bombs were released and evade the first and second bombing passes, but the bombers changed their tactics on the third pass and bracketed all the directions Langley could turn. As a result, Langley took five hits from a mix of  bombs as well as three near misses, with 16 crewmen killed. The topside burst into flames, steering was impaired, and the ship developed a 10° list to port. Langley went dead in the water as her engine room flooded. At 13:32, the order to abandon ship was passed.

After taking off the surviving crew and passengers (Whipple rescued 308 men and Edsall 177) at 13:58, the escorting destroyers stood off and began firing nine  shells and two torpedoes into Langley hull at 14:29 to prevent her from falling into enemy hands, scuttling her at approximately 8°51'04.2"S 109°02'02.6"E After being transferred to the oiler , many of Langleys crew were lost when Pecos was sunk en route to Australia by Japanese carrier aircraft. Out of over 630 total crewmen and Langley survivors on Pecos, 232 were rescued while more than 400 were left behind and died due to Japanese submarines in the area hindering rescue efforts. Exact casualty numbers for the doomed ships of the United States Asiatic Fleet and American-British-Dutch-Australian Command are impossible to gather because so many Allied warships were sunk in the Dutch East Indies campaign (at least 24 total) and many of those ships had already picked up survivors of other sunken ships and then were also sunk by the Japanese hours or days later. Thirty-one of the thirty-three pilots assigned to the USAAF 13th Pursuit Squadron (Provisional) being transported by Langley remained on Edsall to be brought to Tjilatjap, but were lost when she was sunk on the same day by Japanese warships while responding to the distress calls of Pecos.

Awards and decorations

USS Langley'' (as AV-3) earned two battle stars on its Asiatic-Pacific Campaign Streamer: One for the Philippine Islands Operation, 8 December 1941 – 6 May 1942; and one for Netherlands East Indies Engagements, 23 January – 27 February 1942.

See also

Citations

Notes

References

Bibliography

External links

Images of USS Langley (CV-1) in the Naval History and Heritage Command's Photo Archive
Image archive at San Diego Air & Space Museum Archives
Langley at NavSource.org
Video of early landings aboard USS Langley (CV-1) circa 1922

1912 ships
Aircraft carriers of the United States Navy
Aircraft carriers sunk by aircraft
Maritime incidents in February 1942
Proteus-class colliers
Seaplane tenders of the United States Navy
Ships built in Vallejo, California
Ships sunk by Japanese aircraft
Turbo-electric steamships
World War I auxiliary ships of the United States
World War II aircraft carriers of the United States
World War II shipwrecks in the Java Sea